The 2016 Stockton Challenger was a professional tennis tournament played on outdoor hard courts. It was the second edition of the tournament and part of the 2016 ITF Women's Circuit, offering a total of $50,000 in prize money. It took place in Stockton, California, United States, on 11–17 July 2016.

Singles main draw entrants

Seeds 

 1 Rankings as of 27 June 2016.

Other entrants 
The following player received a wildcard into the singles main draw:
  Kayla Day (withdrew)
  Michaela Gordon
  Ashley Kratzer
  Sanaz Marand

The following players received entry from the qualifying draw:
  Jennifer Elie
  Desirae Krawczyk
  Chanel Simmonds
  Caitlin Whoriskey

The following player received entry by a lucky loser spot:
  Priscilla Hon

The following player received entry by a protected ranking:
  Aleksandra Wozniak

Champions

Singles

 Alison Van Uytvanck def.  Anastasia Pivovarova, 6–3, 3–6, 6–2

Doubles

 Kristýna Plíšková /  Alison Van Uytvanck def.  Robin Anderson /  Maegan Manasse, 6–2, 6–3

External links 
 2016 Stockton Challenger at ITFtennis.com
 Official website

2016 ITF Women's Circuit
2016 in American tennis
Tennis tournaments in California
Sports competitions in Stockton, California
2016 in sports in California